Kalinovka is a rural locality (a settlement) in Shatunovsky Selsoviet, Zalesovsky District, Altai Krai, Russia. The population was 34 as of 2013. There are 2 streets.

Geography 
Kalinovka is located 30 km southwest of Zalesovo (the district's administrative centre) by road. Shatunovo is the nearest rural locality.

References 

Rural localities in Zalesovsky District